This is a list of Danish princesses by marriage from the establishment of hereditary monarchy by Frederick III in 1648. Individuals holding the title of princess would usually also be styled "Her Royal Highness" (HRH) or "Her Highness" (HH).

Elizabeth II, Queen of the United Kingdom, Marina Karella and Irina Aleksandrovna Ovtchinnikova, while meeting most of the requirements, are not classed princesses by marriage of Greece and Denmark, because Prince Philip, husband of Elizabeth II, renounced his Greek (and Danish) titles, Prince Michael had a morganatic marriage, and Prince Peter lost his succession rights upon his marriage.

List of princesses of Denmark by marriage since 1648

Danish monarchy
Princesses by marriage